Dimitri Petemou (born 3 August 1980) is a New Caledonian footballer who plays as a goalkeeper for Thio Sport in the New Caledonia Super Ligue.

References

1980 births
Living people
New Caledonian footballers
2016 OFC Nations Cup players
Association football goalkeepers
New Caledonia international footballers